James Harold Waggoner (January 18, 1930 – December 4, 2004) was a Canadian football player, all star and Grey Cup champion who played for the Hamilton Tiger-Cats. He won the Grey Cup with them in 1957. He also played two games for the Toronto Argonauts in 1960. He played college football at Tulane University. After his football career, he was a teacher in Florida. He died of complications during surgery in Fort Myers, Florida in 2004. His grandson Garrett Waggoner was an Ivy League all-star at Dartmouth College and played two seasons for the Winnipeg Blue Bombers.

References

1930 births
Players of American football from Arkansas
Hamilton Tiger-Cats players
2004 deaths
Toronto Argonauts players